The Mercyhurst Lakers women's ice hockey program represented Mercyhurst University during the 2013–14 NCAA Division I women's ice hockey season. Their conference mark was 15-3-2, earning them the College Hockey America regular season title.
In the postseason, the Lakers were defeated 2-1 in overtime by the RIT Tigers during the CHA championship tournament. The Lakers would qualify for the NCAA Tournament. In the quarterfinals, the Lakers defeated Cornell by a 3–2 mark in Ithaca, New York. Advancing to the Frozen Four in Hamden, Connecticut, the Lakers were bested by the eventual national champion Golden Knights.

Standings

Offseason

Recruiting

Roster

2013–14 Lakers

Exhibition

Schedule

|-
!colspan=12 style=""| Regular Season

|-
!colspan=12 style=""| CHA Tournament

|-
!colspan=12 style=""| NCAA Tournament

News and notes
On December 7, 2013, Bestland logged the 200th point of her NCAA career in an 8-0 victory against Penn State.

Awards and honors
Christine Bestland, Top Ten Finalist, Patty Kazmaier Award
Christine Bestland, Mercyhurst Senior Female Student-Athlete of the Year
Christine Bestland, CHA Player of the Month, March 2014

References

Mercyhurst
Mercyhurst Lakers women's ice hockey seasons
NCAA women's ice hockey Frozen Four seasons
Mer
Mercy
Mercy